The 1901 Kendall Orange and Black football team represented Henry Kendall College—now known as the University of Tulsa—as an independent during the 1901 college football season. The team compiled a record of 2–2.

Schedule

References

Kendall
Tulsa Golden Hurricane football seasons
College football winless seasons
Kendall Orange and Black football
Kendall Orange and Black football